Jenison de Jesus Brito e Brito (born 22 March 1991), simply known as Jenison, is a Brazilian professional footballer who plays as a forward for Guarani, on loan from Cuiabá.

Career
Jenison started his career with Paysandu Sport Club before signing with top-flight club Atlético Paranaense and later had stints with Atlético Ibirama and Série B side Bragantino. He signed with NASL club Fort Lauderdale Strikers on 3 July 2014.

References

External links 
 
 

1991 births
Living people
Brazilian footballers
Brazilian expatriate footballers
Footballers from São Paulo (state)
Association football forwards
Campeonato Brasileiro Série A players
Campeonato Brasileiro Série B players
Campeonato Brasileiro Série C players
Campeonato Brasileiro Série D players
Paysandu Sport Club players
Club Athletico Paranaense players
Clube Atlético Hermann Aichinger players
Clube Atlético Bragantino players
Paraná Soccer Technical Center players
J. Malucelli Futebol players
Vila Nova Futebol Clube players
Cuiabá Esporte Clube players
Paraná Clube players
Grêmio Novorizontino players
Guarani FC players
North American Soccer League players
Fort Lauderdale Strikers players
Brazilian expatriate sportspeople in the United States
Expatriate soccer players in the United States
People from Diadema